Smart Start, Inc. is an American manufacturer of alcohol-monitoring technology, including Ignition Interlock Devices and portable alcohol breath-test devices. It provides services and technologies that prevent intoxicated drivers from operating a vehicle. In almost all cases, these devices are installed by court order due to DUI or DWI violations.

History 
Smart Start Inc. was founded and incorporated in September 1992 in Dallas/Fort Worth by Bettye Rodgers and Jay D. Rodgers under the name “1A Smart Start, Inc.” 

On August 21, 2015, 1A Smart Start, Inc. was acquired by ABRY Partners, becoming 1A Smart Start, LLC. On Nov. 8, 2021, the Apollo Impact platform, managed by Apollo Global Management, acquired Global IID Holdco and its subsidiaries, including 1A Smart Start, LLC.

Smart Start claims to have installed over 200,000 ignition interlock devices and reports that these devices have prevented over 7 million vehicle starts due to potential drivers being over the approved limit. The devices are in use in Canada, the United States, and Australia.

Devices 
In 1998, Smart Start began manufacturing National Highway Traffic Safety Association (NHTSA) certified Ignition Interlock Devices. In 2008, Smart Start became the first Ignition Interlock provider to offer a camera with its Ignition Interlock, allowing authorities to monitor alcohol testing via photo.

Smart Start introduced its IN-HOM™ portable alcohol monitoring devices in 2009, rebranded as SmartMobile™.

References

External links
www.smartstartinc.com

See also
Ignition Interlock Device
DUI

Driving under the influence
Vehicle safety technologies